Metzneria clitella is a moth of the family Gelechiidae. It was described by Rebel in 1903. It is found in Libya.

References

Moths described in 1903
Metzneria